Seven Keys to Baldpate is a lost 1925 American silent comedy mystery film based on the 1913 mystery novel by Earl Derr Biggers and 1913 play by George M. Cohan. Previously made in Australia in 1916  and by Paramount in 1917, this version was produced by, and starred, Douglas MacLean and was directed by Fred C. Newmeyer (who later directed Our Gang shorts). Out of seven film adaptations of the story made between 1916 and 1983, this version is the only one that is now considered lost. The story was remade again later in 1929, 1935, 1946 (TV movie), and 1947. It was also remade in 1983 under the title House of the Long Shadows, featuring John Carradine, Peter Cushing, Vincent Price, and Christopher Lee.

Plot
As described in a film magazine review:

Cast

Critical reception
In The New York Times, Mordaunt Hall wrote, "Douglas MacLean, who relies a great deal upon his eyes and his teeth in acting, is only moderately amusing in the film conception of Seven Keys to Baldpate, which is at the Rivoli this week. This does not seem to be as good a vehicle for him as The Yankee Consul and other productions in which he has figured. There are long stretches without much in the way of genuine fun, and Mr. MacLean is rather stiff and his clothes are much too well pressed. He looks as if he had come to life from a man's fashion advertisement, without a characterizing crease."

Critic Troy Howarth comments "The emphasis... is as much on comedy as it is on chills and suspense, and it seems likely that most viewers were familiar with the story's convoluted plot by this time".

References

External links

Douglas MacLean Swedish movie poster for Seven Keys to Baldpate
Biggers, Earl Derr, Seven Keys to Baldpate, New York: Grosset & Dunlap, 1925 photoplay edition illustrated with several stills from the Paramount Pictures film

1925 films
American silent feature films
Lost American films
American films based on plays
Films based on American novels
Paramount Pictures films
1925 mystery films
Films based on adaptations
American mystery films
American black-and-white films
Films based on Seven Keys to Baldpate
Films based on works by George M. Cohan
1925 lost films
Lost mystery films
Films directed by Fred C. Newmeyer
1920s American films
Silent mystery films